Mount Prospect, also known as the Exum Lewis House, was a historic plantation house located near Leggett, Edgecombe County, North Carolina. It was built about 1772, and was a two-story, five bay, Late Georgian style frame dwelling. It had a Quaker Plan; two-story, 19th century addition; and a one-story hip roofed front porch. Also on the property are the contributing family cemetery, a smokehouse, barn, brick dairy, and office.  The house burned and was torn down in 1976.

It was listed on the National Register of Historic Places in 1974.

References

Plantation houses in North Carolina
Houses on the National Register of Historic Places in North Carolina
Georgian architecture in North Carolina
Houses completed in 1772
Houses in Edgecombe County, North Carolina
National Register of Historic Places in Edgecombe County, North Carolina
Burned houses in the United States
Demolished buildings and structures in North Carolina
Buildings and structures demolished in 1976